Fictional works that have main characters with synesthesia and non-fiction books to non-specialist audiences reflect the condition's influence in popular culture and how non-synesthetes view it. Synesthesia is a neurological condition in which one or more sensory modalities become linked. However, for over a century, synesthesia has also been the artistic and poetic devices that try to connect the senses.

Not all depictions of synesthesia in the fictional works are accurate. Some are highly inaccurate and reflect more the author's interpretation of synesthesia than they do the phenomenon itself. For example, Edgar Allan Poe physiologically incorrectly explained synesthesia via a connection between tympanum and retina. Scientific works are intended to accurately depict synesthetic experiences.  However, as research advances, subsequent studies may supersede or correct some of the specific details in older accounts.

In addition to its role in art, synesthesia has often been used as a plot device or as a way of developing a particular character's internal states.  Synesthetes have appeared in novels including Vladimir Nabokov's The Gift and Invitation to a Beheading.

With the increased research into synesthesia from the 1990s into the twenty-first century, more novels have appeared with synesthete-characters.  Since 2001, more than 15 novels featuring synesthete-characters have been published. Author and synesthete Patricia Lynne Duffy in her presentations on "Images of Synesthetes in Fiction" has described four ways in which synesthete characters have generally been used in modern fiction: (1) synesthesia as Romantic ideal; (2) synesthesia as pathology;  (3) synesthesia as Romantic pathology;  (4) synesthesia as health and balance for some individuals (Duffy 2006, 2007).

As romantic ideal
In Vladimir Nabokov's novel, The Gift, the main character Fyodor is a gifted young poet who experiences synesthesia. Fyodor's synesthetic experience of language is compared to that of nineteenth-century French Symbolist poet, Arthur Rimbaud (as expressed in the latter's poem, Voyelles about the perception of colored vowel sounds). Fyodor perceives a sublime beauty in letters and sounds, which he shares with others through poetic description: "If I had some paints handy, I would mix burnt sienna and sepia for you as to match the color of a 'ch' sound..and you would appreciate my radiant 's' if I could pour into your cupped hands some of those luminous sapphires that I touched as a child."  In writing about synesthesia, Nabokov drew on his own synesthetic experiences, as detailed in his autobiography, Speak, Memory.

As pathology
Brain injuries can induce certain types of synesthetic experience. Duffy notes that a character's synesthesia is sometimes shown as a pathological condition related to brain injury.  For example, in the novel, The Whole World Over by Julia Glass, the character Saga experiences words as having color after she has an accident that causes a head trauma. In the quote, Duffy illustrates how the perceived colors are a distraction for the character: "The word would fill her mind for a few minutes with a single color: not an unpleasant sensation but still an intrusion... Patriarch: Brown, she thought, a temple of a word, a shiny red brown, like the surface of a chestnut."

As romantic pathology
This category of synesthesia combines the previous two: the character's synesthesia is portrayed as pathology — but a "glorious" pathology, allowing them to perceive more sublime levels of reality.  In Holly Payne's novel, The Sound of Blue, the character, Milan, a composer, perceives music as having beautiful color, but his synesthetic experience indicates an oncoming epileptic seizure: "Without color, he heard nothing. He filled notebooks with the sound of yellow and red. Purple. Green... Like Liszt and Stravinsky, Kandinsky and Rimbaud, Milan shared the multisensory perception of synesthetes, and unfortunately the seizures that about 4 per cent of them endured... Milan's epilepsy resulted from his multisensory experiences."

As health and balance for some individuals
Duffy argues that in this category of novel, the ability to perceive synesthetically represents health and balance for the particular character. When such characters experience emotional trauma, they lose the ability to perceive synesthetically.  After the trauma is resolved, the character regains synesthetic perception, which represents health and wholeness for that individual. Examples of such characters are found in Jane Yardley's novel, Painting Ruby Tuesday and in Wendy Mass's children's novel, A Mango-Shaped Space. In the latter novel, the 13-year-old character, Mia loses her synesthesia after her beloved cat dies, but regains it after she works through the trauma. As her therapist tells her, "Your colors will return, Mia, I promise. And you'll feel three-dimensional again."

References

Duffy's presentations on "Images of Synesthetes in Fiction"
 "Images of Synesthetes and their Perceptions of Language in Fiction" presentation by Patricia Lynne Duffy at the 6th American Synesthesia Association Conference, University of South Florida St. Petersburg, January 28, 2007.
 "Image of the Synesthete in Modern Fiction", International Conference on Synesthesia, University of Hanover Medical School, December 3, 2006.
 "Images of Synesthetes and their Perceptions of Language in Contemporary Fiction", presentation by Patricia Lynne Duffy at the 5th American Synesthesia Association Conference, University of Texas at Houston medical School, October 2005.

Literature
Literary motifs